The murder of Kathleen Jo Henry occurred on September 4, 2019, in Anchorage, Alaska. The murder occurred at a local TownePlace Suites hotel, operated by Marriott International. The murder of Kathleen Henry, who was also sexually assaulted before her death, made international news when it was revealed that her alleged killer, Brian Steven Smith, recorded her death in both still photograph as well as numerous videos which he recorded on an SD card. Henry's remains were found along Alaska's Seward Highway on October 2, 2019.

Detectives with the Anchorage Police Department recognized Smith from a previous investigation involving him, and obtained a warrant for his arrest. On October 8, 2019, Smith was arrested at Ted Stevens Anchorage International Airport, where he arrived after returning from a trip. Smith was subsequently booked into an Anchorage jail. Police have stated that they discovered thirty-nine photos and twelve videos related to Henry's assault and murder on the SD card, which was found by a woman on the street in the Fairview section of Anchorage.

On October 17, 2019, Smith was charged with the murder of a second woman, Veronica Abouchuk, whom Smith allegedly confessed to killing. Smith allegedly admitted to her death, and told authorities where they could find her body.

Kathleen Jo Henry
Kathleen Jo Henry was born December 22, 1988 in Bethel, Alaska. An Alaska Native woman, Henry obtained her GED in 2012, while incarcerated in Alaska's Highland Mountain Correctional Center, a state prison in the Anchorage neighborhood of Eagle River. A divorcee who was single at the time of her death, Henry struggled with addiction and criminal run ins with law enforcement over the years. She was a frequent user of Facebook and other social media, and enjoyed writing poetry. At the time of her death, she was 30 years old.

Suspect
Brian Steven Smith was identified as the suspect in the murder of Kathleen Henry, based on photograph and video evidence obtained by the Anchorage Police Department. Since then, Smith has been implicated in another murder, and authorities consider him a serial killer. His past in both the United States, as well as in South Africa, is the subject of an ongoing, international investigation.

Brian Steven Smith (b. March 23, 1971) was born in South Africa, in the Queenstown area, and later immigrated to the United States. Smith became a U.S. citizen in September 2019. In 2019, Smith was arrested in Anchorage, Alaska after he returned from an out of state trip, and was charged with the sexual assault and murder of Kathleen Jo Henry that past September, at a Marriott International affiliate, where he was an employee and had rented a discounted room from September 2-4. Police believe the murder of Henry occurred on September 4, 2019.

On October 17, 2019, Smith was charged with murdering a second woman, Veronica Abouchuk, after allegedly confessing to her murder and telling authorities where they could find her body. Detectives with the Anchorage Police Department, as well as the U.S. FBI, continue to look into Smith's past.

See also
List of solved missing person cases
List of unsolved murders

References

2010s missing person cases
2019 in Alaska
2019 murders in the United States
Deaths by person in Alaska
Female murder victims
Filmed killings
Formerly missing people
History of Anchorage, Alaska
Incidents of violence against women
Missing person cases in Alaska
Murder in Alaska
September 2019 crimes in the United States
September 2019 events in the United States
Unsolved murders in the United States
Violence against women in the United States